American country music singer and songwriter Dierks Bentley has released ten studio albums, one live album, one compilation album, and 33 singles. In 2003, Capitol Nashville released Bentley's self-titled debut album. The album's first single, "What Was I Thinkin'", reached number 1 on the US Billboard Hot Country Songs chart, and 22 on the Billboard Hot 100, his highest-charting single there to date. Bentley then released two studio albums in 2005 and 2006 and produced several number 1 hits on Billboard Hot Country Songs. In 2007, Bentley released a live concert DVD, Live and Loud at the Fillmore, which was recorded in Denver, Colorado.

In a March 2008 interview, Bentley said he'd let his fans be the executive producers to his first greatest hits album, Greatest Hits/Every Mile a Memory 2003–2008. A fourth studio album, Feel That Fire was released on February 3, 2009, which produced the number one hits: "Feel That Fire" and "Sideways". On March 8, 2010, Bentley's official website announced that he would be releasing a bluegrass album entitled Up on the Ridge, which was released on June 8, 2010. Two more albums, Home (2012) and Riser (2014), went to number one on the charts as well; the former also produced three number ones on Hot Country Songs ("Am I the Only One", "Home", and "5-1-5-0") between 2011–12 and the latter contained three more number ones on the Country Airplay chart with "I Hold On", "Drunk on a Plane" and "Say You Do" between 2014–15.

Albums

Studio albums

Compilation albums

Live albums

Extended plays

Singles

As lead artist

2000s

2010s

2020s

As featured artist

Promotional singles

Other charted songs

Other appearances

Videography

Video albums

Music videos

Guest appearances

See also
Hot Country Knights#Discography

Notes

References

Country music discographies
Discographies of American artists